Monte Sant'Elia is the name of several mountains:

 Monte Sant'Elia (Massafra), a mountain of Massafra
 Monte Sant'Elia (Palmi), a mountain of Calabria
 Monte Sant'Elia (Varese Prealps), a mountain in the Varese Prealps
 Monte Sant'Elia-Calimosca, an Italian mountain near Cagliari
 Mount Saint Elias, an American mountain in Alaska